Metohija or Dukagjin is a large basin and the name of the region covering the southwestern part of Kosovo. The region covers 35% (3,891 km2) of Kosovo's total area. According to the 2011 census, the population of the region is 700,577.

Districts 
It encompasses three of the seven districts of Kosovo:

Names 
The name Metohija derives from the Greek word  (metóchia; singular , metóchion), meaning "monastic estates" – a reference to the large number of villages and estates in the region that were owned by the Serbian Orthodox monasteries and Mount Athos during the Middle Ages.

In Albanian the area is called Rrafshi i Dukagjinit and means "the plateau of Dukagjin", as the toponym (in Albanian) took the name of the Dukagjini family who ruled a large part of Metohija during the 14th-15th centuries, hence the name.

The term "Kosovo and Metohija" was in official use for the Autonomous Region of Kosovo and Metohija (1945-1963), and also for the Autonomous Province of Kosovo and Metohija (1963-1968). The term "Metohija" was dropped from the official name of the province in 1968, and thus the term "Kosovo" became the official name of the province as a whole. The change was not welcomed by Serbs, who continued to use the old name (for example in the 1986 Draft Memorandum of SANU). In September 1990, the new Constitution of the Republic of Serbia was adopted, changing the official name of the province back to the Autonomous Province of Kosovo and Metohija. This time, the change was not welcomed by ethnic Albanians, who protested against the official use of the term "Metohija". In 2008, after the Kosovo declaration of independence, Serbia included the term "Metohija" into the official name of the newly formed Ministry for Kosovo and Metohija, which was transformed in 2012 into the Office for Kosovo and Metohija.

Geography 
Its principal river is the White Drin. It is bordered by the mountain ranges Mokra Gora in the north and northwest, the Accursed Mountains in the west, Pashtrik in the southwest, the Šar Mountains in the south and southeast, and Drenica in the east and northeast, which distinguishes it from the rest of Kosovo in the east and northeast.

The geographic division between Metohija and the rest of Kosovo causes differences between the two areas' flora and fauna. Metohija has the characteristic influences of the Mediterranean.

Metohija consists of fertile arable land with many small rivers which provide water for irrigation and, in combination with the Mediterranean climate, give excellent fields except for cereals. This area is well known for its high-quality vineyards, fruit orchards, and for the growing of chestnut and almond trees.

The geographical region of Metohija is further divided into four parts: Prizrenski Podgor, Llapusha, Reka and Rugova.

History

Prehistory
Based on archaeology, the region of Kosovo and Metohija and the Morava Valley were interconnected in the Neolithic (Starčevo and Vinča) and Eneolithic. The Triballi of Morava entered Kosovo in two waves in the 8th and 7th centuries BC, then took part in the genesis of the Dardani. Necropolises near Zhur suggest that the southwesternmost part of Metohija at the end of 6th century BC was subject to Illyrian influx. After the Roman conquests, the Metohija region was divided into Dardania and Praevalitana.

Middle Ages

Coinciding with the decline of the Roman Empire, many "barbarian" tribes passed through the Balkans, most of whom did not leave any lasting state. The Slavs, however, overwhelmed the Balkans in the 6th and 7th centuries. The Principality of Serbia included the city of Destinikon, which is mostly believed to have been in Metohija. The region was conquered by Bulgaria in the early 10th century, after which Byzantine rule was restored, briefly ca. 970-975, and again after 1018. In terms of ecclesiastical administration, the region of Metohija belonged to the Eparchy of Prizren, created in 1019. During the 11th and the 12th century, the region was contested between the Grand Principality of Serbia and the Byzantine Empire. Serbian Grand Prince Stefan Nemanja was recognized as independent in 1190, keeping northern parts of the Metohija (region of Hvosno), while southern parts were incorporated into the Kingdom of Serbia by the beginning of the 13th century. After the Fall of the Serbian Empire in 1371, the region of Metohija was controlled by the Balšić family of Zeta, and since 1378 by the Branković family. The region was also controlled by the Principality of Dukagjini. It was part of the Serbian Despotate until 1455, when it was conquered by the Ottoman Empire.

Ottoman cadastral records, particularly the Ottoman defters of the 15th-16th centuries, indicate that the Dukagjin Plains were inhabited by a majority of Albanian Christians during this period. This Albanian Christian majority of the region mainly concerned itself with agriculture and consisted of both Catholic and Orthodox Albanians. Albanian anthroponomy and onomastics prevailed over Slavic ones, and there are many cases of mixed Slav-Albanian anthroponomy; that is to say, Albanians with elements of Slavic anthroponomy as a result of their conversion to the Orthodox faith. The Slavic population of the region during these times consisted of a small minority, and was mainly located in the Nahiya of Peja and with a very small pocket in the Nahiya of Prizren.

Early modern
Metohija was conquered by the Ottoman Empire in 1455 and incorporated into the Sanjak of Prizren (southern part of Metohija) and Sanjak of Peć (northern part of Metohija). In 1878, after several administrative reforms, the region was included into Ottoman Vilayet of Kosovo.

Modern
The area was taken by the Kingdom of Montenegro in the 1912 First Balkan War except for the Prizren area, conquered by Kingdom of Serbia. During the First World War, Montenegro was conquered by the Austro-Hungarian forces in 1915. The Central Powers were pushed out of Metohija by the Serbian Army in 1918. Montenegro subsequently joined the Kingdom of Serbia, which was followed by the formation of the Kingdom of Serbs, Croats and Slovenes. The Kingdom was reformed into the Kingdom of Yugoslavia in 1929. The Kingdom suffered an Axis invasion during World War II in 1941, and the region of Metohija was incorporated into Italian-controlled Albania, with the Italians employing the "Vulnetari", an Albanian volunteer militia, to control the villages. After Italy's treaty with the Allies in 1943, the Germans took direct control over the region, supported by the local Albanian collaborationists (Balli Kombëtar). After numerous rebellions of Serb Chetniks and Yugoslav Partisans, Metohija was captured by Serb forces in 1944. In 1946, it became part of Serbia's Autonomous Province of Kosovo and Metohija, within the transitional Democratic Federal Yugoslavia.

On 17 February 2008, representatives of Kosovo Albanians declared Kosovo's independence and subsequently adopted the Constitution of Republic of Kosovo, which came into effect on 15 June 2008. Serbia still considers Metohija part of its territory.

See also 
Koznik Mountain

Notes

References

Sources 

 
 
 
 
 

Regions of Kosovo
Plains of Kosovo
Albanian ethnographic regions

pl:Kosowo#Metochia